Lisa Nye (born 24 October 1966) is an English cricketer and former member of the England women's cricket team who played as a wicket-keeper. She played 4 Test matches and 21 One Day Internationals. She played domestic cricket for Middlesex.

References

External links
 
 

Living people
England women Test cricketers
England women One Day International cricketers
1966 births
People from Royal Tunbridge Wells
Middlesex women cricketers
Wicket-keepers